Carndonagh is a town on the Inishowen peninsula in County Donegal, Ireland, close to Trawbreaga Bay. It is the site of the Donagh Cross (or St. Patrick's Cross), believed to date to the 7th century. The Irish name, Carn Domhnach, means "the cairn or mound of the church".

Amenities
The town is laid out around a central square, or Diamond, and is dominated by its Romanesque Revival Catholic chapel. It is home to 6 national schools including St. Patrick's GNS and BNS, Glentogher NS, Craigtown NS, Donagh NS, St. Bridget's NS and Carndonagh Community School, formerly the largest community school in the Republic of Ireland. Carndonagh is home to a number of musicians, artists and writers and to the Inishowen Carnival Group, Carndonagh Musical Society, Brass Band, and the Inishowen Gospel Choir (both international performers).

Transport
Carndonagh railway station opened on 1 July 1907, but finally closed on 2 December 1935.

There are private coach services from the town to Derry and Dublin.

Carndonagh is on the R238, R240 and R244 regional roads.

Sport
Some of the sports clubs and organisations active within the community in Carndonagh are:
Carndonagh GAA - the local Gaelic football club which participates in the AllSportStore.com Division 4. 
Carndonagh F.C. - the local soccer club, participating in the Inishowen Football League.

People
John Pitt Kennedy (1796-1879) - engineer 
John Wallace Crawford (1847-1917) - adventurer, educator, and author
Roy Campbell (1901-1957) - South African poet, who explored the legacy of his Carndonagh ancestors in the 1952 memoir Light on a Dark Horse
Tommy Tiernan (born 1969) - comedian
Damien Faulkner (born 1977) - racing driver
Gary Doherty (born 1980) - footballer Norwich City
Keith McErlean - actor

Gallery

See also
 List of towns and villages in Ireland

References

External links
 Visit Carndonagh

Towns and villages in County Donegal